Puthiya Niyamam ( New Law) is a 2016 Indian Malayalam-language crime drama film written and directed by A. K. Sajan. The film stars Mammootty and Nayanthara in the lead roles, along with Baby Ananya, Sheelu Abraham, Rachana Narayanankutty, S. N. Swamy, Roshan Mathew, Anil K. Reji, Sendrayan, and Aju Varghese in supporting roles. The film was released on 12 February 2016. Nayantara won Filmfare Award for Best Actress - Malayalam for her performance in the movie.

The film explores the drug fueled crimes and consumption of substances like marijuana and LSD by the youth. The film was dubbed into Tamil under the title Vasuki. The film was remade in Kannada as Purushottama (2022).

Plot

Louis Pothen (Mammootty) is a popular part-time television film critic, an artist, and a divorce lawyer who also participates in a live TV channel named "Kathrika". His wife Vasuki Iyer (Nayanthara) is a Kathakali artist, and they live together along with their school going daughter Chintha. They live away from their parents since their marriage was an inter-religious one.

One day, Vasuki is raped by her two neighbors, Aryan and Sudeep, who are engineering students (who were like her own brothers), and Pachai, a man who irons clothes at her building. Vasuki goes into shock after the rape. She does not confide in anyone and becomes withdrawn. Her demeanour changes as she becomes irritable and lax in her household work. She even contemplates suicide, but better sense prevails when she realizes that it is her rapists who should die and not her.  After a Kathakali performance, she is complimented by Jeena Bhai, the new police commissioner. Vasuki finds Jeena's phone number from Louis's mobile and calls her and narrates her ordeal. Jeena's telephonic assistance  helps her kills her rapists one by one. After the deed is done, Jeena tells Vasuki that their brief friendship over the phone was over and Vasuki should never contact her again.

It is later revealed that Louis was informed by Swami, a resident of a neighboring apartment building, of his wife being raped. Swami had witnessed Vasuki being raped from his house but was old and too far away to help. He informs Louis about what he saw. Louis then reveals to Swami that through a mobile software (which can transform a male voice to a female voice), he mimics Jeena's voice and guides Vasuki to murder her rapists. He realizes that this was the only way that she would get absolution. Louis never reveals the truth to Vasuki and decides to keep it as a secret so that they could lead a happy married life.

Cast

 Mammootty as Adv. Louis Pothen 
 Nayanthara as Vasuki Iyer Louis, Adv. Louis Pothen's wife 
 Baby Ananya as Chintha, Vasuki and Louis's daughter
 Sheelu Abraham as DCP Jeena Bhai
 Rachana Narayanankutty as Kani, Sudeep's sister
 S. N. Swamy as Swami
 Roshan Mathew as Aryan
 Anil K. Reji as Sudeep, Kani's brother
 Sendrayan as Panchabhasmam (Pachai)
 Aju Varghese as Romanch
 Sreelatha Namboothiri as Pavel Ammachi
 Sadiq as Dayanandan Mash
 Ponnamma Babu as Anuradha
 Sohan Seenulal as Asst. Adv. Baburaj
 Jennifer Antony as Kshemettathi
 Pradeep Kottayam as Thalathil Sreenivasan
 Aniyappan as Sura

Production

Development
In July 2015, it was reported that Mammootty and Nayanthara would play an inter-caste couple in A. K. Sajan's forthcoming film. The film was reported to be initially planned with Suresh Gopi in the lead. It was also reported that Sajan initially wrote the script with Renji Panicker in mind for the lead role, with Muthumani as heroine. But after hearing the script, Renji noted that the script demands a "larger scale" production and suggested Mammootty for the lead role. As per Ranji's suggestion when Sajan approached Mammootty, the offer was immediately accepted by him. Regarding the characters, A. K. Sajan says, "Mammootty's character in the film, Louis Pothen, almost mirrors his real life personality. He's an easy-going lawyer, who is also a film critic and has a socialist leaning. However, Nayanthara's character Vasuki is diametrically opposite."

Filming and post-production
Principal photography commenced on 21 August. The film was initially titled Solomonte Koodaram, but later changed to Puthiya Niyamam. The title was revealed through its first look poster on 27 October 2015. The filming was completed by October 2015 in Ernakulam and Thrissur.

The costumes that Mammootty's character Louis Pothen has to don in film were purchased from Dubai by Mammootty himself. Roby Varghese Raj who was an assistant of cinematographers Rajeev Menon and Jomon T. John debuted as an independent cinematographer in the film.

Editing was done at the residence of Vivek Harshan in Chennai. Harshan, the National Award-winning film editor, was in commitment for six films simultaneously and edited Puthiya Niyamam at the insistence of director Sajan. The post-production works including Mammootty's dubbing were completed in December. However, Nayanthara was unimpressed with the dubbing of her character and expressed her desire to dub for herself. As it would be her debut dubbing in Malayalam language, a dubbing trial was conducted in Chennai in mid-January 2016.

Music
The film consists of two songs composed by Gopi Sunder and Vinu Thomas. But shows only one song in the film.

Box office
Puthiya Niyamam has reportedly collected  and completed more than 7,000 shows in Kerala box office. The film grossed  after 2 weekends at US box office.

Critical reception

Sanjith Sidhardhan of The Times of India rated the film 3 out of 5 concluding, "Puthiya Niyamam is an intense tale elevated by the screen presence of its protagonists. It has a fresh take on certain aspects and is worth a one-time watch." Rating 3.5 out of 5, Akhila Menon of Filmibeat called the film "a perfect thriller" and appreciated Mammootty and Nayanthara for their performance and "exceptional" screen chemistry, A. K Sajan for his direction and "brilliantly-written" script and Gopi Sundar for his "extraordinary" background score. The critic said, "The movie is engaging from the beginning till the end, even though most of the scenes are restricted to the lead characters." Anu James of International Business Times also gave a rating of 3.5 in a scale of 5, saying "With thrilling moments accompanied by right amount of comedy, AK Sajan's scripting in "Puthiya Niyamam" makes the movie interesting and thought provoking," and noted Nayanthara's performance as her "career-best".

References

External links
 
 

2016 films
2010s Malayalam-language films
2016 crime thriller films
Indian crime thriller films
Films about rape in India
Films shot in Kochi
Films shot in Thrissur
Films about drugs
Films directed by A. K. Sajan
Malayalam films remade in other languages